Oncerotrachelus is a genus of assassin bugs in the family Reduviidae. There are about 14 described species in Oncerotrachelus.

Species
These 14 species belong to the genus Oncerotrachelus:

 Oncerotrachelus acuminatus (Say, 1832)
 Oncerotrachelus amazonensis Gil-Santana, 2013-13
 Oncerotrachelus conformis Uhler, 1894
 Oncerotrachelus coxatus McAtee & Malloch, 1923
 Oncerotrachelus cubanus Bruner & Barber, 1937
 Oncerotrachelus fuscus Monte, 1943
 Oncerotrachelus geayi Villiers, 1943
 Oncerotrachelus lynchii (Berg, 1879)
 Oncerotrachelus magnitylus Barber, 1931
 Oncerotrachelus nasutus (Bergroth, 1913)
 Oncerotrachelus pallidus Barber, 1922
 Oncerotrachelus paraconformis Gil-Santana, 2013-13
 Oncerotrachelus sabensis Cobben & Wygodzinsky, 1975
 Oncerotrachelus spiniventris Hussey, 1953

References

Further reading

External links

 

Reduviidae
Articles created by Qbugbot